Sophie Alexandra Skelton (born 7 March 1994) is an English actress. She is best known for her role as Brianna Fraser in the Starz drama series Outlander.

Biography
Skelton was born and raised in Woodford, Greater Manchester, the daughter of entrepreneurial children's toy inventors. She began dancing at the age of three, eventually training in ballet at the Royal Academy, before moving into musical theater and stage productions. Her first professional television role, in Series two of the British crime drama DCI Banks (2012), was a two episode stint as schoolgirl Becca Smith.

Skelton attended Stockport Grammar School, completing her A Levels in 2012. She was going to study English Literature at King's College London the following year but ended up turning down her offer to pursue acting instead.

In 2013, Skelton guest-starred as Esme Vasquez-Jones in series one of CBBC's award winning children's drama The Dumping Ground. That same year, she went on to portray Nikki Boston's (Heather Peace) estranged daughter Eve in the ninth series of BBC One's school-based drama series, Waterloo Road, and Yasmin Carish in a series thirteen episode of the long running medical series Doctors.

Transitioning into feature films, Skelton's first role was in 2014's The War I Knew. She portrayed Margaret in director Ian Vernon's tale of a WWII paratrooper lost behind enemy lines.

2015 saw a return to episodic television for Skelton. She again appeared in the BBC series Doctors, portraying Ellen Singleton in the series sixteen episode "Revenge". Next she guest starred in a series nine episode of ITV's WWII and post-war era legal drama Foyle's War. Later that year Skelton appeared in a twelve episode stint as Sofia Matthews on So Awkward, CBBC's sitcom revolving around three socially awkward school-age friends, and a two episode guest starring role as Gemma Holt on BBC One's medical drama Casualty.

Skelton's first leading film role was in Charlotte Stente Nielsen's 2016 fantasy-horror short Blackbird. Her breakout role, in the British fantasy action-adventure series Ren: The Girl with the Mark, came later that year. She won Best Lead Actress at the Hyperdrive Sci-Fi and Fantasy Film Festival for her role in the series. 2016 also saw Skelton cast in the role of Brianna Fraser McKenzie in STARZ hit TV Series Outlander. The role, opposite Scottish actor Richard Rankin as Roger Mackenzie is recurring, becoming a main cast member from Season 4 onwards,  and will continue throughout their story arc as outlined in Diana Gabaldon's genre bending book series.

In 2017, Skelton portrayed Jess in Christopher Menual's film Another Mother's Son, the true story of Louisa Gould, a widow living in Nazi occupied Jersey during WWII.  From there she went on to star alongside Nicolas Cage in the bank heist film #211 (2018), based upon the real-life "Battle of North Hollywood" in 1997, and Day of the Dead: Bloodline (2018), a remake of the 1985 George Romero zombie film.

Filmography

Film

Television

Awards and nominations

References

External links
 
 Ren: The Girl with the Mark Website

1994 births
21st-century English actresses
English film actresses
English television actresses
Living people
Actresses from Greater Manchester
People educated at Stockport Grammar School